The following articles contain lists of cricketers who have played for the Western Australian cricket team, organised by format:

 List of Western Australia first-class cricketers
 List of Western Australia List A cricketers
 List of Western Australia Twenty20 cricketers

See also
 List of international cricketers from Western Australia (includes only cricketers born in Western Australia)
 List of Western Australia cricket captains
 Western Australia Combined XI

Lists of Australian cricketers